Walt Disney Giant was a forty-eight page, bimonthly Disney comic book published by Gladstone Publishing from September 1995 to September 1996. It featured the adventures of Scrooge McDuck, his nephews, Mickey Mouse, and other Disney characters.

Index

See also
 Disney comics 
 Disney comics titles in the USA:
 Mickey Mouse Magazine (1935-1940)
 Walt Disney's Comics and Stories (1940-present)
 Donald Duck (1942-2017)
 Mickey Mouse (1943-2017)
 Uncle Scrooge (1952-present)
 Walt Disney Comics Digest (1968-1976)
 Uncle Scrooge Adventures (1987-1997)
 Mickey Mouse Adventures (1990-1991)
 Donald Duck Adventures (1988-1998)
 Walt Disney Giant (1995-1996)

External links

Walt Disney Giant on Disney Comics Worldwide (DCW)

Disney comics titles
Gladstone Publishing titles
Comics about mice and rats
Comics about ducks
1995 comics debuts
1996 comics endings